Farm Pride is a Nigerian brand that produces fresh fruit juices and yoghurts. The company is based in Kaduna, Kaduna State. Farm Pride is owned by Niyya Farms, an agro-industrial enterprise that owns a processing facility, dairy farm, orchards and agricultural lands.

Overview
Farm Pride prides itself in creating its beverages from natural fruits as opposed to concentrates. The name Farm Pride, refers to the fact that the company uses natural, cultivated fruits for its fresh juice line. The fruits are cultivated on a 3,000 hectare piece of land in Kaduna.

In 2015, Farm Pride announced that it will begin selling of concentrated puree of juices to fruit juice companies in Nigeria.

Availability
Farm Pride Juice is mostly available in large stores across Nigeria. It is available in all Nigerian branches of Shoprite and Spar as well as other individual major stores.

List of juices and yoghurts 
Orange juice
Guava Juice
Mango Juice
Tropical Juice
Plain Yogurt
Sweetened Yogurt

References

Food and drink companies of Nigeria
Companies based in Kaduna State
Nigerian brands
Kaduna
Year of establishment missing